The Sperry Land and Sea Triplane was an American three seat amphibious aircraft designed as a coastal reconnaissance/bomber. Two examples were built and tested for the U.S. Navy towards the end of the First World War. The machine performed well on land and water, but no orders were placed.

Design and development 
Aircraft designer and aviation pioneer Alfred Verville working with Lawrence Sperry, conceived the aircraft to perform a similar role as the Curtiss HS series of flying boats, with the added ability to operate from land bases. The machine was an equal span two bay triplane with N-type interplane struts of all wood construction.
Power was provided by a  Liberty L-12 water cooled engine turning a four bladed fixed wooden propeller in a pusher configuration.

The outrigger style empennage consisted of a single large vertical stabilizer and tailplane connected to the center main wing with two horizontal tubular spars. Two vertical struts were attached to the aft end of each tube spar and met at the extreme rear of the fuselage forming a very robust triangular  structure.
The high mounting of the tail was designed to prevent damage in heavy seas. When operating on the water with the engine off, the craft was much more seaworthy running "backwards" into the wind due to its hull design. Because of this, a unique tailskid could be folded down into a vertical drag position to make the machine lie tail into the wind.

The retractable hand-operated main landing gear pivoted upward to allow take offs and landings on water and the  wheel assemblies could also be jettisoned after takeoff, increasing range and performance, but necessitating a water landing. The Sperry Land and Sea Triplane was one of the first American aircraft to make use of retractable landing gear, developed by Sperry in 1915.

Specifications

See also
 List of flying boats and floatplanes
 Flying boat

References

External links
Sperry Amphibious Triplane images

Sperry aircraft
Verville aircraft
Amphibious aircraft
Triplanes
Single-engined pusher aircraft
Aircraft first flown in 1918